The Swedish Red Cross (Swedish: Svenska Röda Korset) is a Swedish humanitarian organisation and a member of the International Red Cross and Red Crescent Movement. Founded in 1865, its purpose is to prevent and alleviate human suffering wherever and whenever it occurs, voluntarily and without discrimination. Within Sweden, it operates more than 1,000 local branches, which are run by local committees.

See also
 Dolo hospital airstrike
 White Buses

References

External links 
 Swedish Red Cross Homepage
 IFRC: Swedish Red Cross Profile

Red_Cross_and_Red_Crescent_national_societies
1865_establishments_in_Sweden
Organizations established in 1865
First_aid_organizations